In physical cosmology, the electroweak epoch was the period in the evolution of the early universe when the temperature of the universe had fallen enough that the strong force separated from the electroweak interaction, but was high enough for electromagnetism and the weak interaction to remain merged into a single electroweak interaction above the critical temperature for electroweak symmetry breaking (159.5±1.5 GeV
in the Standard Model of particle physics). Some cosmologists place the electroweak epoch at the start of the inflationary epoch, approximately 10−36 seconds after the Big Bang. Others place it at approximately 10−32 seconds after the Big Bang when the potential energy of the inflaton field that had driven the inflation of the universe during the inflationary epoch was released, filling the universe with a dense, hot quark–gluon plasma. Particle interactions in this phase were energetic enough to create large numbers of exotic particles, including W and Z bosons and Higgs bosons. As the universe expanded and cooled, interactions became less energetic and when the universe was about 10−12 seconds old, W and Z bosons ceased to be created at observable rates. The remaining W and Z bosons decayed quickly, and the weak interaction became a short-range force in the following quark epoch.

The electroweak epoch ended with an electroweak phase transition, the nature of which is unknown. If first order, this could source a gravitational wave background. The electroweak phase transition is also a potential source of baryogenesis, provided the Sakharov conditions are satisfied.

In the minimal Standard Model, the transition during the electroweak epoch was not a first- or a second-order phase transition but a continuous crossover, preventing any baryogenesis,
or the production of an observable gravitational wave background.

However many extensions to the Standard Model including supersymmetry and the two-Higgs-doublet model have a first-order electroweak phase transition (but require additional CP violation).

See also

Chronology of the universe

References

Physical cosmology
Big Bang